African Violet (Persian: بنفشه آفریقایی, romanized: Banafsheh Afrighaei) is a 2019 Iranian drama film directed by Mona Zandi Haghighi and written by Haghighi and Hamidreza Bababeigi. The film screened for the first time at the 37th Fajr Film Festival and received 2 nominations.

Cast 

 Fatemah Motamed Aria as Shokoo
 Saeed Aghakhani as Reza
 Reza Babak as Fereydoun
 Mehdi Hosseinina as Ghasem
 Roya Javidnia as Soraya
 Neda Jebraeili as Fereshteh
 Maryam Shirazi as Shahla

Reception

Accolades

References

External links 
 

2010s Persian-language films